Cirripectes imitator, the imitator blenny, is a species of combtooth blenny found in coral reefs in the western Pacific ocean.  This species reaches a length of  TL.

References

imitator
Taxa named by Jeffrey T. Williams
Fish described in 1985